Haetera piera, the amber phantom, is a butterfly species from the subfamily Satyrinae in the family Nymphalidae. This species can be found in the Guianas, Brazil, Ecuador, Peru, Bolivia and Venezuela.

Subspecies
Haetera piera piera
Haetera piera diaphana Lucas, 1857 (Brazil: Bahia)
Haetera piera negra C. & R. Felder, 1862 (Peru, Ecuador, Brazil: Amazonas)
Haetera piera unocellata Weymer, 1910 (Bolivia)
Haetera piera pakitza Lamas, 1998 (Peru)

References

External links
 

Butterflies described in 1758
Haeterini
Fauna of Brazil
Nymphalidae of South America
Taxa named by Carl Linnaeus